Valter Kalaus (born 12 August 1970) is a Hungarian swimmer. He competed in three events at the 1988 Summer Olympics.

References

1970 births
Living people
Hungarian male swimmers
Olympic swimmers of Hungary
Swimmers at the 1988 Summer Olympics
Universiade medalists in swimming
Swimmers from Budapest
Universiade bronze medalists for Hungary
20th-century Hungarian people
21st-century Hungarian people